Homoeotricha procusa is a species of tephritid or fruit flies in the genus Homoeotricha of the family Tephritidae.

Distribution
Mongolia, China.

References

Tephritinae
Insects described in 1971
Diptera of Asia